The Napier Mountains are a group of close set peaks, the highest being Mount Elkins, at about 2,300 meters above sea level. This mountain range is located in Enderby Land, in the claimed Australian Antarctic Territory, East Antarctica.

Location
The Napier Mountains are roughly four degrees west of Cape Boothby, Edward VIII Bay and Edward VIII Ice Shelf, and 3.5 degrees east of Amundsen Bay. The Napier Mountains are centered about 64 km south of Cape Batterbee in Enderby Land, East Antarctica. It extends about 64 km in a NW-SE direction from Mount Codrington, and also includes Mount Kjerringa, and the Young Nunataks.

Discovery
The Napier Mountains were discovered in January 1930 by the British Australian New Zealand Antarctic Research Expedition (BANZARE) under Sir Douglas Mawson. They were named by Mawson after the Hon. Sir John Mellis Napier, a Judge of the Supreme Court of South Australia, 1924–42 and Chief Justice of South Australia, 1942–67. This mountain range was first visited by an ANARE party in 1960. Members of this party included Syd Kirkby and Terence James Elkins.

Features
Geographic features of the Napier Mountains include:

 Fitzgerald Nunataks
 Grimsley Peaks
 Mount Breckinridge
 Mount Codrington
 Mount Elkins
 Mount Griffiths
 Mount Maines
 Mount Rabben
 Skorefjell
 Stor Hånakken Mountain
 Wilkinson Peaks
 Young Nunataks

Geology & orogeny

The Napier Complex is among the most ancient terrestrial terranes on Earth. Its evolution is characterized by high-grade metamorphism and several strong deformations. At least four distinct tectonothermal events occurred in the Archaean Eon:
 3.8 billion years ago: occurrence of initial felsic igneous activity over a long period of time
 3.0 billion years ago: emplacement of charnockite at Proclamation Island
 2.8 billion years ago: occurrence of a very-high grade discrete tectonothermal event (a UHT metamorphic event)
 2.5 billion years ago: occurrence of a subsequent, protracted high-grade tectonothermal event

Much of the East Antarctic craton was formed in the Precambrian period by a series of tectonothermal orogenic events. Napier orogeny formed the cratonic nucleus approximately 4 billion years ago. Mount Elkins is a classic example of Napier orogeny. Napier orogeny is characterized by high-grade metamorphism and plate tectonics. The orogenic events which resulted in the formation of the Napier Complex (including Mount Elkins) have been dated to the Archean Eon. Radiometrically dated to as old as 3.8 billion years, some of the zircons collected from the orthogneisses of Mount Sones are among the oldest rock specimens found on Earth. Billions of years of erosion and tectonic deformation have exposed the metamorphic rock core of these ancient mountains.

The oldest crustal components found to date in the Napier Complex appear to be of igneous derivation. This rock appears to have been overprinted by an ultra-high temperature metamorphic event (UHT) that occurred near the Archean-Proterozoic boundary. Using a lutetium-hafnium (Lu-Hf) method to examine garnet, orthopyroxene, sapphirine, osumilite and rutile from this UHT granulite belt, Choi et al determined an isochron age of 2.4 billion years for this metamorphic event. Using SHRIMPU–Pb zircon dating methodology, Belyatsky et al determined the oldest tectonothermal event in the formation of the Napier Complex to have occurred approximately 2.8 billion years ago.

Preservation of the UHT mineral assemblage in the analyzed rock suggests rapid cooling, with closure likely to have occurred for the Lu-Hf system at post-peak UHT conditions near a closure temperature of 800 °C. UHT granulites appear to have evolved in a low Lu-Hf environment, probably formed when the rocks were first extracted from a mantle profoundly depleted in lithophile elements. The source materials for the magmas that formed the Napier Complex were extremely depleted relative to the chondritic uniform reservoir (CHUR). These results also suggest significant depletion of the early Archean mantle, in agreement with the early igneous differentiation of the Earth that the latest core formation models require.

References

Further reading

External links
 Australian Antarctic Names and Medals Committee (AANMC)
 Australian Antarctic Gazetteer
 United States Geological Survey, Geographic Names Information System (GNIS)
 Scientific Committee on Antarctic Research (SCAR)
 PDF Map of the Australian Antarctic Territory
 Mawson Station

Mountain ranges of Enderby Land